Duchess is a rural town and locality in the Shire of Cloncurry, Queensland, Australia.

Geography 
The town is in the east of the locality. The Cloncurry Duchess Road, which is part of the Cloncurry-Dajarra Road, passes through the locality from south to east, passing through the town. The Great Northern railway passes through the locality from east to north-west, passing through the town which is served by the Duchess railway station.

Duchess is surrounded by a series of stations including Mayfield station and Stradbroke station.

The Dajarra railway line 

Butru is a neighbourhood within the locality, which developed around the Butru railway station.

Juenburra is neighbourhood within the locality, which developed around the Juenburra railway station.

Woobera is a neighbourhood within the locality, which developed around the Woobera railway station. 

In the north of the locality, there is a watershed separating into three drainage basins. The Leichhardt River and its east branch rise in the north of the locality and flows north into the Gulf of Carpentaria. The Malbon River rises in the north-east of the locality and flows north-east into the Cloncurry River and ultimately into the Flinders River and into the Gulf of Carpentaria. While the Wills Creek, Green Creek and Pilgrim Creek which rise in the south of the locality flow south and into the Bourke River and ultimately into the Georgina River which theoretically flows into Lake Eyre, but only rarely is there sufficient water for this occur.

History 
Kalkatunga (also known as Kalkadoon, Kalkadunga, Kalkatungu) is an Australian Aboriginal language. The Kalkatunga language region is North-West Queensland including the local government areas of the City of Mount Isa.

The town's name was derived from the name of the mine, which was named by pastoralist Alexander Kennedy when his son John Peter Kennedy discovered a deposit of copper there in 1897 and led to the founding of the town. (Alexander Kennedy would later be the first passenger on a Qantas plane from Cloncurry.) Duchess was the name or nickname of the Aboriginal consort of pastoralist St John de Satge who was nicknamed "The Duke", who had run away and sought refuge at Kennedy's Calton Downs station. A 1987 map indicates that Duchess was previously named Mairindi.

Duchess railway station opened on 21 October 1912 when the Great Northern railway line reached Duchess from Malbon.

The Butru railway station was named by the Queensland Railways Department on 26 July 1915; it is an Aboriginal word referring to the waterhole where the railway line crosses the Wills River. The Dajarra railway line from the town of Duchess reached Butru on 18 December 1915.

The Woobera railway station was named by the Queensland Railways Department on 19 October 1917; it is an Aboriginal word meaning shelter for sleeping.

The Juenburra railway station was named by the Queensland Railways Department on 17 October 1918; it is an Aboriginal word meaning bush fly.

In the 1911 census, the town had a population of 397. By 1915 the population boomed to over 1000. By the 1920s, the town's population dropped. At its peak and for a while afterwards, Duchess was home to four pubs, a school, a post office, a train station, and four automobile garages.

Amenities 
 Duchess Pub

Transport

References

External links 
 Town map of Duchess, 1970

Towns in Queensland
Shire of Cloncurry
Localities in Queensland